Jennifer Demby-Horton (born August 10, 1968) is an American former handball player. She competed in the women's tournament at the 1996 Summer Olympics.

References

External links
 

1968 births
Living people
American female handball players
Olympic handball players of the United States
Handball players at the 1996 Summer Olympics
Place of birth missing (living people)
21st-century American women
Pan American Games gold medalists for the United States
Competitors at the 1995 Pan American Games
Medalists at the 1995 Pan American Games
Pan American Games medalists in handball